Among the honorifics in Judaism, there are several traditional honorifics for the dead which are used when naming and speaking of the deceased. Different honorifics might be applied depending on the particular status of the deceased. These honorifics are frequently found on gravestones, on memorial walls inside the sanctuary of synagogues, in speeches, and in writing such as in obituaries.

In writing, it is most common to use the name followed by an abbreviation of an honorific either in Hebrew or English. For examples, see chart.

Comparison chart 
The following chart shows different honorifics used, along with their abbreviation in Hebrew and English, their translation, the masculine and feminine forms, the type of person which the honorific is applied to, and examples.

General honorifics 
Some honorifics may be used for any individual. These honorifics are generally not used for rabbis or other special persons, since the specific honorifics for those people are used instead, as a sign of honor and respect. See below.

Of blessed memory 
The most common honorific is "of blessed memory" or "may his/her memory be a blessing." The Hebrew transliteration is "zikhrono livrakha" (m.) / "zikhronah livrakha" (f.) (Hebrew: (f.) "" \ (m.) ""). It is often abbreviated in English both as OBM and as “Z"L” The Hebrew abbreviation is "."

Although in the past it was common to use this expression for living people as well In the Babylonian Talmud, it is mentioned that a person should say this expression about his dead father, in addition to the phrase "I am the atonement of his bed". 

Peace be upon him/her 
An alternative honorific is "Peace be upon him/her." The Hebrew version is "alav ha-shalom" (m.) / "aleha ha-shalom" (f.) (Hebrew: (m.) "" / (f.) ""). It is abbreviated in English as “A"H.” The Hebrew abbreviation is "."

This phrase is the same as the Islamic honorific "peace be upon him" (which is used for all prophets of Islam). However, unlike in Islamic usage, the English abbreviation "PBUH" is not commonly used for the Jewish honorific.

The above two may be used interchangeably; however "of blessed memory" is the most common.

The term עליו השלום did not appear in Hebrew literature until the early Rishonic period, a century after its introduction in Judeo-Arabic. According to the theory of Michael Broyde, after the Arab conquest the Arabic phrase  (peace be upon him) was translated to Hebrew  and was used for any deceased person, a usage which spread to the Jews of Christian Europe beginning in the 12th century.

May HaShem avenge his/her blood 
This honorific "May HaShem avenge his/her blood" is generally used for an individual who are considered to have been martyred through acts of anti-Semitism such as pogroms, genocide, or terrorist attacks. The term is also applied to any innocent Jew killed, whether for anti-Semitic reasons or others. The Hebrew phrase is "" (m.) / "" (f.) / "" (pl.) and in the Hebrew: "" (m.) / "" (f.) / "" (pl.). The English abbreviation is “HY"D” and in Hebrew "."

Other 
Other expressions used to add to the names of people who died: "the deceased", "rest of Eden", "rest in peace." It is customary to sign the tombstones with the initials תַּנְצְבָ"ה (תְּהִי נִשְׁמָתוֹ צְרוּרָה בִּצְרוֹר הַחַיִּים (according to the language of the verse: and the soul was a pure soul in the chorus of life).

Holy and the righteous 
The abbreviation “/” stands for "/May his merit shield us," and often follows the mention of meritorious righteous ones. A variant is “/” which adds "Amen" at the end. This expression stems from the belief that a righteous person who passes to the next world can serve as an advocate before God for his remaining community.

Memory of the righteous 

In Hebrew transliteration: "" and in Hebrew: "." The English abbreviation commonly used is “” and in Hebrew, "" is used. It is pronounced in reading as "." It may be also written as “”.

It is used primarily in reference to rabbis who have been deceased in recent memory. Thus, one is likely to write “Rabbi Moshe Feinstein ZT"L” (d. 1986) but far less likely to write "Rashi ZT"L" (d. 1105). This expression is utterly synonymous with Z"L (see above) in that Z"L inherently implies the person was righteous, but, in modern Hasidic communities, where  has acquired a different meaning, ZT"L may be used to distinguish the Tzadik in that modern sense.

In the course of time, additional versions of the above expressions were created, for example: ""; "may the memory of the righteous and holy be a blessing" (ZTVK"L), "may the memory of the righteous and holy be a blessing for the life of the world to come".

Memory of the wicked 
While the above mentioned positive honorifics are added to the names of beloved people, the names of particularly wicked (evil, despised) people are sometimes embellished with the phrase "Yimakh shemo" ימח שמו, "May his name be blotted out". Another phrase is "Shem reshaim yirkav" שם רשעים ירקב, "wicked's name will rot".

See also 
 Bereavement in Judaism
 Honorifics in Judaism
 Chazal

References 

Bereavement in Judaism
Orthodox rabbinic roles and titles
Judaism